Hit or Hait or Heyt or Heyyat may refer to:
 Hit, Qasr-e Qand (هيت - Hīt)
 Hit, Sarbaz (حيط - Ḩīţ)